The Indonesian Institute of Sciences (or LIPI) was the governmental authority for science and research in Indonesia. It consists of 47 research centers in the fields ranging from social to natural sciences.

With the enactment of Presidential Decree No. 33/2021 on 5 May 2021, LIPI was disbanded along with government research agencies such as Agency of Assessment and Application of Technology (Indonesian: Badan Pengkajian dan Penerapan Teknologi, BPPT), National Nuclear Energy Agency (Indonesian: Badan Tenaga Nuklir Nasional, BATAN), and National Institute of Aeronautics and Space (Indonesian: Lembaga Penerbangan dan Antariksa Nasional, LAPAN). All of those agencies fused into the newly formed National Research and Innovation Agency (Indonesian: Badan Riset dan Inovasi Nasional, BRIN).

Currently the disbandment process is still on process and expected to be finished on 1 January 2022.
On 1 September 2021, LIPI finally dissolved as independent agency and transformed into four Technical Implementing Organizations of BRIN: Engineering Science Research Organization, Earth Sciences Research Organization, Life Sciences Research Organization, and Social and Humanities Research Organization), indicating the beginning of the institutional integration of the former LIPI into BRIN.

History
With growing interest in scientific research, the government of the Dutch East Indies established  (Scientific Council of the Dutch East Indies) in 1928. It operated as the country's main research organization until the Japanese occupation in 1942. The Dutch returned to Indonesia and resumed control of the council, the institute was renamed  (OPIPA, Organisation for Scientific Research) in 1948.

And in 1966 the government changed the status of DURENAS into Lembaga Riset Nasional (LEMRENAS) (National Research Institute).

In August 1967 the government dissolved LEMRENAS and MIPI with presidential decree no. 128/1967 and established the current Indonesian Institute of Sciences. The new institute ran the operation that was previously covered by LEMRENAS and MIPI.

Research areas 
LIPI had several research centers:
 Science and technology development
 Geotechnology
 Oceanography
 Limnology
 Metallurgy
 Biology
 Biotechnology
 Biomaterial
 Physics
 Chemistry
 Informatics
 Electrical engineering and mechatronics
 Electronics and telecommunication
 Social and cultural sciences
 Economy
 Population studies
 Politics
 Regional resources
 Calibration, Instrumentation and Metrology
 Quality control and testing

Public services 
LIPI was responsible for several public services related to science, technology and research activities across Indonesia.
 ARSIP (Scientific Data Mirroring Service)
 Indonesia NTP (Network Time Protocol)
 Public Cluster (open and free facility to perform distributed computing)
 ISSN Online
 FRP (Foreign Researcher Permit Online)
 ISI (Indonesian Scientific Index)
 Indonesia OSS (Indonesia Open Source Software)
 Info H@KI (information on Intellectual Property Rights)
 Jurnal Online  (online journal management system)
 KOKI (Online Calculator for Scientific and Financial Performance)
 Indonesia MoW (Indonesia Memory of the World)
 OPI (online professional organization and conference management system)
 LIPI-IR (LIPI Institutional Repository)
 SciBlog (online scientific web-log for scientific collaboration)
 TESIS Online (archive and repository of theses works in Indonesia)
 Uji Kalibrasi (calibration service)
 LUP  (Lab Uji Polimer)
 LEWS (Landslide Early Warning System)

Affiliation 
LIPI directly or indirectly authorized several scientific organizations in Indonesian, as:
 CODATA Indonesia
 COREMAP

Botanical Gardens
LIPI managed four botanical gardens in Indonesia, which were all developed during the Dutch colonial period:
 Bogor Botanical Garden, West Java
 Cibodas Botanical Garden, West Java
 Purwodadi Botanical Garden, Pasuruan, East Java
 Bali Botanic Garden, Bali

Electric car

English economic journal
June 2011: To increase LIPI's reputation around the world, and give Indonesian researchers more international credibility from currently ranked about 220th in the world, LIPI launched a biannual English-language journal, Review of Indonesian Economic and Business Studies (RIEBS).

Joint projects
Together with Japan's National Institute of Technology and Evaluation, LIPI  significantly increased Indonesia's microbial collection record from 200 to 6,500 between 2003 and 2009 and more than 1,800 microbes are believed to be new discoveries.

The Royal Netherlands Institute of Southeast Asian and Caribbean Studies has an office ("KITLV-Jakarta", set up in 1969) in Jakarta that collaborates with LIPI.

End of LIPI 
On 1 September 2021, LIPI finally dissolved and transformed into 4 Technical Implementation Organizations of BRIN, indicating the beginning of the institutional integration of the former LIPI to BRIN.

References

External links
 

Indonesian Institute of Sciences
Science and technology in Indonesia
Members of the International Council for Science
Members of the International Science Council
1956 establishments in Indonesia
2021 disestablishments in Indonesia